Avocado Heights is an unincorporated census-designated place (CDP) in the San Gabriel Valley of Los Angeles County, California, United States. It is almost entirely surrounded by the City of Industry with only a small strip of unincorporated Los Angeles County separating it from South El Monte. It is in close proximity to both the Pomona (SR-60) and San Gabriel (I-605) freeways. To the west is the San Gabriel River and the California Country Club. The population was 15,411 at the 2010 census, up from 15,148 at the 2000 census.

A significant portion of Avocado Heights remains equestrian and semi-rural, with many homes on lots of 0.5 acres  or more. The proximity of polluting industries in what became the City of Industry, as well as the Puente Hills Landfill, suppressed property values throughout the post-World War II era—discouraging the development that transformed most of the San Gabriel Valley into a relatively densely developed suburban area.

Geography

Avocado Heights is located at  (34.038610, −118.004575), or about 1.7 miles (2.7 km) southeast of El Monte.

The primary thoroughfare is Don Julian Road, named for the nickname given to early Anglo settler William Workman by local Californios; his homestead lies on Don Julian Road just to the east in Industry. The community is served by Don Julian Elementary School, which is part of the Bassett Unified School District.

Culture
Avocado Heights is known for its private ranches with horse riding. 

From the 1920s till the early 2000s, there was a tall, single white tower on 3rd Avenus and Starlight Lane, until it was demolished for housing development. 

From the 2010s a skatepark was built in Avocado Heights.

Climate

Avocado Heights is classified as Hot Summer Mediterranean climate. It is characterized by warm winters and very hot summers and receives a shielding effect from nearby hills to the south which keeps it warmer than other cities nearby.

Demographics

2010
The 2010 United States Census reported that Avocado Heights had a population of 15,411. The racial makeup of Avocado Heights was 8,564 (55.6%) White (7.8% Non-Hispanic White), 136 (0.9%) African American, 107 (0.7%) Native American, 1,359 (8.8%) Asian, 13 (0.1%) Pacific Islander, 4,726 (30.7%) from other races, and 506 (3.3%) from two or more races. Hispanic or Latino of any race were 12,648 persons (82.1%).

The Census reported that 15,332 people (99.5% of the population) lived in households, 79 (0.5%) lived in non-institutionalized group quarters, and 0 (0%) were institutionalized.

There were 3,813 households, out of which 1,900 (49.8%) had children under the age of 18 living in them, 2,351 (61.7%) were opposite-sex married couples living together, 622 (16.3%) had a female householder with no husband present, 331 (8.7%) had a male householder with no wife present.  There were 205 (5.4%) unmarried opposite-sex partnerships, and 23 (0.6%) same-sex married couples or partnerships. 368 households (9.7%) were made up of individuals, and 181 (4.7%) had someone living alone who was 65 years of age or older. The average household size was 4.02.  There were 3,304 families (86.7% of all households); the average family size was 4.16.

The population was spread out, with 4,210 people (27.3%) under the age of 18, 1,676 people (10.9%) aged 18 to 24, 4,277 people (27.8%) aged 25 to 44, 3,575 people (23.2%) aged 45 to 64, and 1,673 people (10.9%) who were 65 years of age or older.  The median age was 33.7 years. For every 100 females, there were 98.5 males.  For every 100 females age 18 and over, there were 96.4 males.

The homeowner vacancy rate was 0.7%; the rental vacancy rate was 3.1%.  11,422 people (74.1% of the population) lived in owner-occupied housing units and 3,910 people (25.4%) lived in rental housing units.

According to the 2010 United States Census, Avocado Heights had a median household income of $72,240, with 14.1% of the population living below the federal poverty line.

2000
As of the 2000 census, the population was 15,148, with 3,758 households, and 3,280 families residing in the CDP. The population density was 5,675.7 inhabitants per square mile (2,190.5/km). The racial makeup of the CDP was 51.43% White, 1.47% Black or African American, 1.16% Native American, 9.12% Asian, 0.11% Pacific Islander, 33.06% from other races, and 3.66% from two or more races.  77.74% of the population were Hispanic or Latino of any race.

Of the 3,758 households, 45.6% had children under the age of 18 living with them, 66.0% were married couples living together, 14.2% had a female householder with no husband present, and 12.7% were non-families. 9.7% of all households were made up of individuals, and 3.8% had someone living alone who was 65 years of age or older.  The average household size was 4.00 and the average family size was 4.16.

The age range was 30.9% under the age of 18, 10.9% from 18 to 24, 29.5% from 25 to 44, 20.0% from 45 to 64, and 8.7% who were 65 years of age or older.  The median age was 30 years. For every 100 females, there were 99.3 males.  For every 100 females age 18 and over, there were 97.5 males.

The median income for a household in the CDP was $48,712, and the median income for a family was $48,939. Males had a median income of $30,837 versus $26,481 for females. The per capita income for the CDP was $14,570.  About 13.2% of families and 16.3% of the population were below the poverty line, including 22.0% of those under age 18 and 9.8% of those age 65 or over.

Government

Education
Students in the northern portion of Avocado Heights are zoned to Don Julian Elementary School in the Bassett Unified School District and to Bassett High School while students in the southern portion are zoned to Wallen Andrews Elementary School in the Whittier City School District and to Pioneer High School in the Whittier Union High School District.

References

 
Communities in the San Gabriel Valley
Census-designated places in Los Angeles County, California
Puente Hills
Census-designated places in California